The following NASCAR national series were held in 1991:

1991 NASCAR Winston Cup Series – The top racing series in NASCAR
1991 NASCAR Busch Series – The second-highest racing series in NASCAR

 
NASCAR seasons